Canada's Story is a Canadian historical documentary television series which aired on CBC Television in 1966.

Premise
This 20-part series Canadian history was produced by the National Film Board of Canada (NFB). Most episodes were compiled from previous film series such as The Struggle for Self-Government (1961), Prelude to Confederation (1962) and Explorers (1964) and generally grouped under the overall NFB title The History Makers. The overall time line of the series covered the past four centuries.

Episodes included dramatic portrayals of historic figures such as Henry Hudson (Powys Thomas), Sir John A. Macdonald (Robert Christie), Alexander Mackenzie (Don Francks) and David Thompson (James Douglas). Numerous producers and directors created the films.

Scheduling
This hour-long series was broadcast weekdays at 4:00 p.m. (Eastern) from 5 to 30 September 1966.

See also

 Canada: A People's History
 Events of National Historic Significance
 Heritage Minutes
 National Historic Sites of Canada
 Persons of National Historic Significance
 The Greatest Canadian

References

External links
 

CBC Television original programming
1966 Canadian television series debuts
1966 Canadian television series endings
National Film Board of Canada documentary series
1960s Canadian documentary television series
Television series about the history of Canada